Sierras de Cazorla, Segura y Las Villas Natural Park is a natural park in the eastern and northeastern part of the province of Jaén, Spain, established in 1986. It was declared a biosphere reserve by UNESCO in 1983 and also a Special Protection Area for migratory birds in 1988.

Protected area
Given its large area, embracing 23 municipalities with more than 80,000 inhabitants, the level of protection varies from one part of the park to another, allowing a diversity of economic activity in the majority of the territory.

The beauty of the countryside and the rich flora and fauna combine with a rich cultural heritage to make the region an important destination for tourism.

The park includes two high ranges, the Sierra de Cazorla and the Sierra de Segura. These mountain ranges are part of the Prebaetic System, the northernmost portion of the Baetic Cordillera. Generally running southeast-to-northeast, they meet up with the Sierra Morena that runs from this region west to Portugal.

Other important peaks are Alto de la Cabrilla, Cabañas, Las Banderillas, Aguilón del Loco, Blanquillo or Pedro Miguel, and El Yelmo.

Comarcas
The natural park is composed of municipalities of three comarcas of Jaén:
 The Comarca of Sierra de Cazorla, some 40 percent of whose terrain falls inside the park, constituting 24.5 percent of the park.
 The Comarca of Sierra de Segura, some 40 percent of whose terrain falls inside the park, constituting 67.1 percent of the park. 32.5 percent of the park falls within the single municipality of Santiago-Pontones. 
 The Comarca of las Villas, constituting the remaining 8.3 percent of the park.

Geology

Throughout the park are magnificent karstic formations of dolomitic limestone, formed by the dissolving action of water on the soluble stone. Examples include the baroque Cerrada de Elías and  Salto de los Órganos in the Borosa River. La Toba has been described as a "haughty staircase to heaven" of pure white travertine, with labyrinthine caves of water along the right bank of the Segura in the hamlet of the same name. Or the Los Anguijones Caves on the right bank of this same river below the Anchuricas Reservoir, like two fantastic giants' abodes.

Flora
Within these mountain ranges is Spain's largest continuous area of pine forest, with representatives of nearly all pine species found in the Iberian Peninsula, the most abundant being European black pine (Pinus nigra). These species were repopulated long ago and their growth has been aided by abundant rainfall. Yet higher are forests of holm oak (Quercus ilex), Portuguese oak (Quercus faginea), and gall oak (Quercus lusitanica), and important areas of maritime pine (Pinus pinaster). In the wettest areas are ancient yews (Taxus baccata) and European holly (Ilex aquifolium), both scarce in Andalusia. Along the rivers are ash, willows, and poplars as well as reeds and cattails that provide shelter to waterfowl and small mammals.

The park has some of the richest and most varied flora of the Mediterranean basin. More than 2170 species have been catalogued, 34 exclusive to the territory, among these the Cazorla violet (Viola cazorlensis), the Cazorla geranium (Geranium cazorlensis or cazorlense), and the Cazorla columbine (Aquilegia pyrenaica subsp. cazorlensis), as well as two endemic species of narcissus. Also of note is the carnivorous butterwort Pinguicula vallisnerifolia.

Within the park is the Torre del Vinagre Botanical Garden, where representative plants of the region are on public display.

Fauna

The variety of fauna is also vast. There are 50 species of invertebrates found nowhere else.
Among the 30 species of mammals living in the park are great number of deer, Spanish ibex (Capra pyrenaica) and wild boars (Sus scrofa), as well as important populations of mouflon (Ovis aries orientalis), a wild sheep, and fallow deer (Dama dama). Except for the Spanish ibex, these were introduced for hunting, and have caused some pressure on the native species. Wolves were also re-introduced in recent decades.

Among the 130 species of birds are the griffon vulture (Gyps fulvus) and the golden eagle (Aquila chrysaetos), as well as the bearded vulture (Gypaetus barbatus) in the process of repopulation.

The rock lizard known as the Spanish algyroides (Algyroides marchi) was discovered there in 1958. The park also has six species of amphibians.

Human history
The park contains prehistoric Rupestrian painting sites, including in the Cuevas de Pardis near the Segura River, and there is evidence of Iberian settlements dating from 2000 BCE.

Threat

The chief threats to the park, as much for flora as for fauna, are the recurring forest fires, which have become more frequent and have had disastrous effects for some portions of the park. Development and human activity continue to be a grave threat, requiring a proportional increase in vigilance and firefighting, as the fire risk continues to rise:
In summer 2005 in the Sierra de las Villas and the west side of the Tranco over  burned after an electrical storm en the middle of a record heat wave; right in the heart of the park, this was the most massive and devastating disaster in the park's history.
 
A particular hazard is over-exploitation for tourism, especially at well-known locations such as the village of Arroyo Frío, where tourism has vastly increased with no changes to the infrastructure. The sewage treatment plant at Arroyo Frío intended for about 400 people is saturated every weekend, when ten times that number of visitors arrive, and inadequately treated fecal matter makes its way into the Guadalquivir, to the detriment of fauna and flora.

There have been epidemics, such as the scabies that decimated the population of Spanish ibex in the 1990s, or the local Austropotamobius pallipes crayfish that became virtually extinct due to a fungus that spread after the introduction of North American crayfish.
Equally, plant species have suffered epidemics that have damaged the health of extensive forest areas, such as the pine processionary (Thaumetopoea pityocampa), a moth that does major damage to conifers.

Other lesser problems are illegal hunting and logging, animals killed on the highways that pass through the park, and reduction and fragmentation of habitats.

Climate change from global warming has already caused irregularities in the level of precipitation in Cazorla, which endangers the native plants and, by extension, the ecosystem.

Notes

External links
 El Parque Natural, official page on the site of the municipality of Segura de la Sierra. Includes a map of the park and a list of the municipalities that fall within it.
 Parque Natural Sierras de Cazorla, Segura y Las Villas, official page on the site of the Andalusian Autonomous Government.
 Parque Natural de las Sierras de Cazorla, Segura y Las Villas: Actividades: hiking, climbing, cycling, etc. Official page on the site of the Andalusian Autonomous Government.
 An unofficial portal for the park.

Province of Jaén (Spain)
Natural parks of Spain
Natural parks of Andalusia
Biosphere reserves of Spain